Heterotropic may refer to:

Heterotropic allosteric modulation of enzymes
Heterotropic modulation of the chemical synapse